eConversions is an online marketing company based in Clerkenwell, London. eConversions was founded by brothers Duncan and Max Jennings in 2004 and is mostly known for launching VoucherCodes.co.uk in August 2008, currently the UK's largest coupon code website. In August 2011 VoucherCodes.co.uk was acquired by WhaleShark Media, which was partly funded by several venture capital firms including Google Ventures. Whaleshark Media re-branded as RetailMeNot, Inc. in March 2013.

References
http://www.olswang.com/news/2011/08/2012/01/olswang-advises-econversions-on-the-sale-of-its-hit-website-vouchercodescouk/
https://techcrunch.com/2011/08/15/whaleshark-media-buys-uks-top-coupon-site-vouchercodes/
https://archive.today/20121224050502/http://www.here.org.uk/2007/10/a4u-expo-wrap-up-award-winners-and-photos.html
https://archive.today/20121223234021/http://www.here.org.uk/2008/06/a4u-affiliate-marketing-awards-2008-wrapup-and-photos.html
https://web.archive.org/web/20140823052421/http://www.azam.info/a4u-awards-uk-affiliate-marketing-event-top-online-achievers/
https://web.archive.org/web/20130127013348/http://www.affiliates4u.com/news/2010/06/a4uawards-record-haul-econversions-vouchercodescouk/
https://web.archive.org/web/20121014130207/http://www.affiliates4u.com/news/2011/05/a4uawards-winners-highly-commended-2011/
https://web.archive.org/web/20121014130348/http://www.affiliates4u.com/news/2012/05/performance-marketing-awards-winners-highly-commended-2012/

Digital marketing companies of the United Kingdom
Marketing companies established in 2004